Jone Macilai-Tori (born 27 August 1990 in Suva, Fiji), is a professional rugby union player. Macilai plays as a winger.

Career
Macilai was spotted by local sevens coach Lote Rasiga and was included in the Red Rock sevens squad. He was later spotted by Awanui Rugby Club coach Glen Subritzky playing sevens at Coral Coast sevens tournament in Fiji in 2012 who included him in his squad. His performance for Awanui saw him selected for Northland in 2013 alongside the returning Rupeni Caucau. He missed most of the games in the season due to a dislocated elbow.

A strong 2014 ITM Cup saw him receive Super Rugby offers from the Blues, Highlanders and Crusaders. He signed with the Crusaders and partnered with block busting Fijian winger, Nemani Nadolo.

A broken arm in pre season meant he was out injured for 3 months. He made his debut off the bench on 8 May scoring a try on debut against the Reds.

He mainly played as a backup winger for the Crusaders in the 2016 Super Rugby season behind Nemani Nadolo, Johnny McNicholl and David Havili but a few injuries in the backline to Ryan Crotty and McNicholl saw him start a few games. He started against the Brumbies in Round 8 and scored a try set up by Matt Todd. In Round 10, he started on the left wing due to Nadolo being given a 4 week ban and scored three tries, two of which were set up by Israel Dagg and he also set up a try for Scott Barrett as well. He also charged down a conversion successfully of Red's flyhalf Jake McIntyre which is a rarity in rugby.

References

External links 
 
 Northland profile

Crusaders (rugby union) players
Northland rugby union players
1990 births
Living people
Fijian rugby union players
Rugby union wings
Sportspeople from Suva
I-Taukei Fijian people
Blues (Super Rugby) players
Munakata Sanix Blues players
Moana Pasifika players